M for Mother (romanized: Mim Mesle Madar) is an Iranian film. Directed by Rasoul Mollaqolipour, the film stars Ali Shadman, Golshifteh Farahani and Hossein Yari. it was selected as the Iranian entry for the Best Foreign Language Film at the 80th Academy Awards, but it was not nominated.

The film is among the highest box office records in the history of Iranian cinema. Acclaimed Iranian actress Golshifteh Farahani stars in this film. The film's score attained great acclaim, composed by Arya Aziminejad.

See also
Iranian cinema

References

External links
 

Iranian drama films
Persian-language films
2006 films